Glipostenoda neocastanea is a species of beetle in the genus Glipostenoda. It was described in 1990.

References

neocastanea
Beetles described in 1990